Amari is a village and a municipality in Rethymno regional unit, Crete, Greece. The seat of the municipality is the village Agia Foteini. One of the major geographic features of Amari is the Amari Valley, a landform of high elevation known for olive cultivation. It is thought that Monastiraki was developed by Phaistos inhabitants founding a satellite center as they pushed out into the Amari Valley.

Municipality
The municipality Amari was formed at the 2011 local government reform by the merger of the following 2 former municipalities, that became municipal units:
Kourites
Sivritos

Province
The province of Amari was one of the provinces of the Rethymno Prefecture. It had the same territory as the present municipality. It was abolished in 2006.

References

Municipalities of Crete
Provinces of Greece
Populated places in Rethymno (regional unit)